HyperOffice is a privately held American corporation based in Rockville, Maryland, that offers web collaboration, online meeting, web conferencing, online database and email marketing applications to the small and mid-sized business segment. Their flagship product is the HyperOffice Collaboration Suite, which contains integrated tools including business email, mobile mail, document collaboration, intranet/extranet publishing, contact management, calendaring, task management, forums, and other applications.

HyperOffice is a paid service, and as of 2009, the company has served around 300,000 customers worldwide.. HyperOffice is specialized in 3 types of industry: Healthcare, Public Sector and Education.

The company was funded during the dot-com bubble of 1998–2000 and subsequently changed its name to WebOS and adopted the primary goal of developing a web-based operating system, taking focus off its collaboration products. In 2002, however, the company re-opened its doors as HyperOffice to concentrate on its collaboration products again.

The company has its headquarters located in Rockville, Maryland.

History

HyperOffice was founded in 1999 by Drew Morris and Shervin Pishevar. The lead angel investor was Strategic Technology Investors, co-managed by Roy Morris and Steve Zecola, two former telecom executives.  It was one of the earliest incarnations of hosted groupware, along  with sites such as Jump.com (bought by Microsoft), When.com (bought by AOL), and Hotoffice (which failed but was restarted). It was amongst the early few companies to offer software-as-a-service (SaaS), a popular and emergent approach to application deployment today. Also, its later incarnation, WebOS, had a contribution in the emergence of the rich Internet language known as Ajax.

The product was originally launched as a free service and targeted toward individuals and small businesses. It enjoyed modest success and was soon funded by a group of private investors.

WebOS

While HyperOffice was building out its collaboration functions, a young Swedish programmer, Fredrik Malmer released a web site known as webos.org to demonstrate the power of a web-based desktop. The site was immediately heralded for its innovative use of JavaScript and DHTML. Within months of its release Malmer was contacted by HyperOffice and joined the company. Shortly afterwards the company changed its name to myWebOS.com, a year later it became WebOS.com.

Within a few months Daniel Steinman, Erik Arviddson and Emil A Eklund joined the team. Each of these developers went on to be prominent members of the web development community   . The company then began work on the WebOS API, a predecessor of the now-ubiquitous Ajax.

The WebOS API served as one of the earliest JavaScript event/object models that was overlaid on the browser. It formalized a process for asynchronous communication through the use of Iframes or Layers (depending on the browser). Perhaps more importantly, the WebOS API marked the first time a collection of JavaScript libraries were managed by a single central "kernel" and loaded on demand whenever a dependent object was instantiated, a practice common in compiled languages. This was a step forward in the history of rich Internet applications as it formalized a process that is now used in almost all of the modern Ajax frameworks.

Although the WebOS API's were published briefly, they were published as the company was going through a dissolution process. They were largely ignored by the developer community because of the company's lack of support for them.

Rebirth

Although the company had changed its name multiple times to focus on the WebOS portion of its business, the core functionality of its products had always rested in its collaboration technologies. After the dotcom bubble burst in 2001, the HyperOffice service was maintained by its founders for over a year. In 2002 the company began development anew under its old name, HyperOffice, and re-dedicated its efforts to provide a collaboration suite (this time as a paid service).

HyperOffice has continued to operate on the online collaboration market since then and is one of the well known names in the crowded market today. It has served around 300,000 customers worldwide since its re-establishment. HyperOffice won the Computerworld Horizon Awards in 2006, and also the Small Business Technology Magazine “Product To Watch Award” the same year,.

Products 

All of HyperOffice’s features are integrated in a single suite. HyperOffice positions itself as an alternative to Microsoft messaging and collaboration products for small to mid-sized businesses, more specifically as a “Sharepoint alternative” and “Exchange alternative”. HyperOffice’s features are as follows:
Email Service
Webmail
Outlook Integration
Intranet/Extranet Publisher
Calendaring
Contact Management
Task Management
Forums
Polling
IM
Time and Expense Application
Universal Login

It includes two plugins, HyperShare and HyperDrive. HyperShare allows HyperOffice users to integrate and synchronize with Outlook. HyperDrive allows files in HyperOffice’s online folders to be managed from the desktop.

In 2008, HyperOffice launched new products to add to its line of online productivity tools. HyperCamapign is an online tool for automated email marketing campaigns.

Notes and references

Online companies of the United States
Internet properties established in 1999
Companies based in Rockville, Maryland
1999 establishments in Maryland